Rawlin is a surname. Notable people with the surname include: 

Andrew Rawlin (born 1960), British cross-country skier
Eric Rawlin (1897–1943), English cricketer
John Rawlin (1856–1924), English cricketer

Given name
Rawlin Mallock (c.1649–1691), English politician

See also
Rawlins (surname)